The Cyprus Tennis Federation (CTF) (Greek: Ομοσπονδία Αντισφαίρισης Κύπρου, ΟΑΚ) is the governing body for the game of tennis in Cyprus. It was founded in 1951. Since 1984 it has been organising Cyprus’ participation in the Davis Cup.

It is a full member of the International Tennis Federation (ITF) and Tennis Europe (TE).

National members of Tennis Europe
Sports organizations established in 1951
Tennis
Tennis in Cyprus
1951 establishments in Cyprus